Disney Branded Television is a unit of Disney Entertainment which oversees development and production of content geared towards children, teenagers and families for Disney+, Disney Channel, Disney Junior and Disney XD. The unit also oversees all Disney+ and Disney Channels unscripted series and specials.

Prior to the formation of Disney Branded Television, Disney Channels Worldwide oversaw all Disney television networks until the organization of the Walt Disney Direct-to-Consumer & International segment on March 14, 2018, when the company was split into two. The U.S. unit operated Disney Channels, Radio Disney. The networks' financial management is now overseen at Disney Media and Entertainment Distribution. The international unit operated various children and family-oriented TV channels around the world, including variations of the U.S. channels plus Disney International HD, Dlife, and Hungama TV.

Disney Channel was originally established in the United States in 1983 as a premium channel, and has since converted to a basic service; in addition, Disney Channel's programming has also expanded internationally with the launch of various country-specific and regional versions of the channel, as well as program licensing agreements reached with television networks not bearing the Disney Channel brand.

Previous corporate names were: Walt Disney Entertainment, Inc. (1982–1983), The Disney Channel, Inc. (1983–1997), Disney Channel, Inc. (1997–2001), ABC Cable Networks Group (2001–2005) and Disney Channels Worldwide (2005–2020).

History

Walt Disney Entertainment, Inc. 
On November 10, 1981, Walt Disney Productions and Westinghouse Broadcasting announced that they had joined up to start a family-oriented cable television service. In 1982, Disney hired Alan Wagner to develop a cable channel.

20 months after the launch, the channel moved into the home satellite dish market thus scrambling its signal.

By July 15, 1982, Disney incorporated Walt Disney Entertainment, Inc., which was renamed by January 28, 1983, to The Disney Channel, Inc.

The Disney Channel, Inc. 
The Disney Channel was launched in April 1983 as a premium channel with 16 hours of programming.

The channel became profitable in January 1985.

The channel started moving to the basic cable level on September 1, 1990, with TCI Montgomery Cablevision. In March 1995, the second Disney Channel began broadcasting in Taiwan while the third is launched in October for the United Kingdom.

Disney Channel, Inc. 
By September 29, 1997, the corporate name was shortened to Disney Channel, Inc. Disney had hired Geraldine Laybourne away from the Nickelodeon channel in 1996. She founded a kids channel codename ABZ, which the media speculated to be aimed at preschoolers. Laybourne dismissed this report. In December 1997, the Toon Disney channel was announced as a basic channel consisting of Disney animated programming. As of April 1, 1998, most of the international versions are pay channels while the Taiwan and Malaysia versions are ad supported and the USA version is a basic channel. The Toon Disney Channel was launched on April 18, 1998, on the Disney Channel's 15th anniversary.

In 2000, the Playhouse Disney preschool channel was launched in the United Kingdom. while in the US, in 1997, the Playhouse Disney block was launched on Disney Channel. In June 2001, Disney was looking into launch Playhouse Disney as a channel in the United States for 2002.

ABC Cable Networks Group 
Disney Channel, Inc. changed its name to ABC Cable Networks Group, Inc. by January 31, 2001. In October 2003, ABC Family Worldwide was shifted from Disney COO Bob Iger's directly reporting unit to the ABC Cable Networks Group. In early 2004, Disney Channel's original programming leaders took over ABC Family's original movies unit temporarily as two ABC Family executives left the channel.

In January 2004, Fox Kids Europe, Fox Kids Latin America and ABC Cable Networks Group created the Jetix programming alliance that would rebrand Fox Kids as Jetix for all blocks, channels and companies. ABC1 launched on the United Kingdom's digital terrestrial television platform on September 27, 2004.

Disney Channels Worldwide 

In November 2005, Barry Blumberg resigned as president of Walt Disney Television Animation to allow the planned transfer of TV animation to Disney Channels Worldwide.

In 2006, Disney Television India acquired Hungama TV from UTV Software Communications Limited Disney Cinemagic began broadcasting in the UK in March 2006 to of several Cinemagic channels, including timeshift and HD versions across Western Europe. ABC1 ceased broadcasting on all UK TV platforms at noon on September 26, 2007.

In Spain, Walt Disney Company Iberia purchased 20% of Management Company Television Net TV SA (or NET TV) in February 2008. In late May 2008, the company announced the move of Disney Channel to the digital over-the air space, replacing NET TV's Fly Music on July 1, 2008.

The company's Japanese unit, Walt Disney Television International Japan, started procuring its own animated series in March 2008, with the first two series to debut at Tokyo International Anime Fair 2008. The company produced Stitch! with Madhouse Company, while Fireball was produced with Jinni's Animation Studios.

After two Disney Channel stars had various scandals, the company started a set of classes for their young stars in 2009 to adapt to the pressure of fame. Optional monthly life-skill classes were added in 2014.

Disney XD (DXD) was launched on February 13th 2009, taking over the channel space of Toon Disney in the US, while Jetix switched over to DXD (or for some Disney Channel) starting with France on April 1. In April, The Walt Disney Company Japan, and Disney Channels Worldwide started Broadcast Satellite Disney Co., Ltd. to broadcast a women and family targeted channel called Dlife with licensed content, received in October 2010 and debuted on March 17, 2012.

Jetix Play closed down on August 1, 2010, in most countries, on September 1, 2010, in Turkey, and in Romania on March 12, 2011.  In these countries, the channel was replaced with Playhouse Disney.

On May 26, 2010, Disney–ABC Television Group announced the launch of Disney Junior, which would replace the Playhouse Disney Morning block on sister network Disney Channel in February 2011, and extend to a standalone preschooler-oriented channel that would replace Soapnet in January 2012. All 22 Playhouse Disney channels and blocks outside the U.S. were also renamed to "Disney Junior" in 2011.

In October 2011, Disney reached a joint venture agreement (49%/51%) with UTH Russia, in which UTH will turn its broadcasting network Seven TV into a Disney Channel starting in early 2012. On March 28, 2013, Cinemagic was replaced with Sky Movies Disney in the UK market under license to BSkyB.

In April 2013, Disney announced that Das Vierte, its recent purchased broadcast station in Germany, would become a Disney Channel in January 2014 as a 24-hour family entertainment network. Disney formed an in-house ad sales company called Disney Media + for the channel, given that two competitors control most ad sales companies.

Disney India Media Networks shut down Bindass Play, a Hindi music channel, and replaced it with Disney International HD on October 29, 2017. This general entertainment channel is in English and HD, targeted to ages 14 to 25 while only tapping Disney live action shows.

Company split 
With Disney's March 14, 2018 reorganization, all international channels including Disney Channel have been transferred to Walt Disney Direct-to-Consumer and International, a new segment, while the US unit is still under Disney–ABC Television Group. On January 9, 2019, Disney India Media Networks shut down Disney XD India and replaced it with Marvel HQ, a channel featuring shows and movies from Marvel Entertainment as well as some acquired programming.

Shortly after the November 2019 launch of Disney+ in New Zealand, Disney shut down its linear channels there. In June 2020, Disney Channels Worldwide announced that all three of the networks owned by Disney Channels Worldwide in the United Kingdom would be shut down on October 1, with content thereafter to be available via the Disney+ streaming service, as the extension of a carriage deal with Sky and Virgin Media could not be reached.

Disney Branded Television 
Following a company restructuring in November 2020, the Disney channels became part of Disney Branded Television, a newly created unit of Disney General Entertainment Content. Headed by the former Disney Channels Worldwide president, Gary Marsh, the new unit oversees development and production of content made for kids, tweens, teens and families for Disney Channel, Disney Junior, Disney XD and Disney+. Disney Branded TV also oversees all Disney+ unscripted series and specials. In December 2020, Disney announced that Radio Disney and Radio Disney Country would cease operations in early 2021. Following the reorganization, the management of Disney XD was moved to Disney Media and Entertainment Distribution.

On May 25, 2021, Disney announced that they would close 100 TV channels internationally by the end of 2021 following the 30 closures that occurred in 2020; this not only included Disney-branded channels, but also Fox Networks Group channels inherited from Disney's acquisition of 21st Century Fox in 2019. The closure was mostly targeted in Asian countries.

On March 1, 2022, Marvel HQ in India was rebranded to Super Hungama.

In March 2022, the Russian channel was reported to be still broadcasting, despite Disney's cessation of operations in the country in response to the 2022 Russian invasion of Ukraine. Its website (kanal.disney.ru) was later ceased operations and its social media accounts were deleted since September 30, 2022, and it cease broadcast on December 14, 2022  following their dissolution of their joint venture with Media-1.

The closure of the global channels continued in 2022, as it closes Latin American and Turkish channels in the early months of the year.

On March 15, 2023, Disney Channel HD was launched in India.

Localization 

The international on-air channel brand's look is consistent with the Disney brand. Individual channel managers can develop schedules and marketing programs to allow children's preferences in the market. Additionally, local programming that meets Disney's standards, combined with difficulties, is acquired. If a program is thriving in a market, its format may be developed for other Disney Channels' market viewing tastes. But most of Disney's channels in their foreign markets were shut down since 2020, all in favor of Disney+.

Asia 
Disney Channel Asia officially launched on January 15, 2000, as a single video feed with an English audio track being the default and Mandarin audio and subtitle tracks also available. The channel became available in Malaysia, Singapore, Brunei and the Philippines. On June 1, 2002, the channel was launched in the South Korea market as a Korean-language feed. Over the first six months of 2005, Disney Channel Asia along with sister channel Playhouse Disney launched in Vietnam, Palau and Thailand and finishing off with a launch of both in Cambodia, its 11th market, with Cambodia Entertainment Production Co. Ltd. as distributor. Disney Channel Asia was also made available on select cable providers in Bangladesh after Disney Channel India was banned in the country back in 2013. It ceased transmissions by the end of 2021.

Japan 
In April 2009, the Walt Disney Company Ltd. Japan and Disney Channels Worldwide started Broadcast Satellite Disney Co., Ltd. to broadcast a women and family targeted channel, with licensed received in October 2010 and debuted on March 17, 2012. In December 2013, Dlife launched a children's programming block called Disney Time. The channel was shut down on March 31, 2020.

China 
Disney Channel does not have a localized version for China. However, many of its live-action and animated series are syndicated on regional channels through ABC owned Dragon Club since 1994. It also has a Chinese website.

India 
Previously, Disney programming was available through programming blocks starting as early as 1994 with Doordarshan then moving to Zee TV until the early 2000s. Disney moved its block to Sony Television for three years. Star TV pick up Disney TV blocks on Star Plus, Disney Time, and on Star Utsav.

In December 2004, Walt Disney Television International India launched a Toon Disney channel with three language feeds (English, Tamil and Telugu) at the same time as the Disney Channel with Star TV network distributing the channels. Disney reached an agreement with Doordarshan (DD) in November 2005 for DD to carry a half-hour block called Disney Jadoo. Thus Disney was up to 4 branded blocks in India.

Canada 
On April 16, 2015, Corus Entertainment announced that it had reached a multi-year agreement with Disney-ABC Television Group to acquire Canadian rights to Disney Channel's programming library, and launched Disney Channel in Canada on September 1, 2015—the first time that a Disney Channel-branded network has operated in Canada.

Prior to this agreement, rights to Disney Channel programming had been held by Family Channel, a network owned by children's media conglomerate WildBrain which is licensed as a premium service but is carried as a basic service by many television providers. Family was formerly owned by Astral Media which was acquired by Bell Media in 2013. As a result of the fact that the majority of Disney Channel U.S.'s programs aired on Family, coupled with the fact that both channels developed similarly in their respective countries (as both began as premium services before adding availability via basic subscription), Family Channel was commonly considered to be a de facto Canadian version of Disney Channel (though it was often mistakenly assumed to be related to ABC Family (now Freeform), a sister network to Disney Channel U.S. which was formerly known as The (emphasis added) Family Channel from 1988 to 1998; a Canadian version of ABC Family (now Freeform) launched in March 2012, called ABC Spark to avoid confusion with Family Channel, to which it does not share common ownership). Some Canadian-produced original series produced by Family (such as Life with Derek, Naturally, Sadie, and Overruled!) have aired on Disney Channel in the United States and in other countries in the past. In addition to its distribution agreement with Disney Channel U.S., Family also operated an English-language version of Disney Junior as a multiplex channel, as CRTC rules allow pay-TV channels licensed as premium services to add multiplex channels consistent with the network's license. Disney XD and a French-language version of Disney Junior were also owned by DHX Media, operating under separate licenses.

DHX's program supply agreement with Disney ended on January 1, 2016; as a result of these re-alignments, its Disney-branded networks were re-launched as spin-offs of the Family brand beforehand on September 18, 2015 (Family Jr. and Télémagino) and October 9, 2015 (Family Chrgd, now known as WildBrainTV.).

List of Disney Channels

Current channels 

The political status of Kosovo is disputed. Having unilaterally declared independence from Serbia in 2008, Kosovo is formally recognized as an independent state by 97 UN member states (with another 15 states recognizing it at some point but then withdrawing their recognition) and 96 states not recognizing it, while Serbia continues to claim it as part of its own sovereign territory.

Relaunched via free-to-air replacing Das Vierte.

Initially went localized on August 1, 2010.

Initially went separated from Eastern Europe feed into a 2 channels on October 1, 2011.

Defunct channels 

Initially went free-to-air on January 12, 2012
 Replacing Jetix; later went free-to-air on December 31, 2011 replacing Seven TV.

Channel types per market

See also 

 Walt Disney Television (Disney General Entertainment Content)
 List of Disney Junior TV channels
 List of Disney XD TV channels

References

External links 
 Official press website, Disney General Entertainment Content

1982 establishments in California
American companies established in 1982
Mass media companies established in 1982

Disney Media Networks
Branded Television
Cable network groups in the United States
Broadcasting companies of the United States
Companies based in Burbank, California